Mohd Hayati bin Othman (born 12 June 1957) is a Malaysian politician and is the member of the Kedah State Legislative Assembly for . He was a member of the Parliament of Malaysia for the Pendang constituency in Kedah from 2004 to 2013, as a member of the opposition Pan-Malaysian Islamic Party (PAS).

Hayati was elected to the Pendang seat in the 2004 election with a 50-vote margin. Two years earlier, he had been defeated in a by-election for the seat occasioned by the death of PAS's leader Fadzil Noor. The 2004 victory was a rare win for PAS in an election where it lost 20 of its 27 seats. Hayati then increased his majority in the 2008 election. He had contested the seat in a by-election in 2002, but was defeated by Othman Abdul of the United Malay National Organisation. He was replaced as the PAS candidate for Pendang ahead of the 2013 election, to make way for the party's deputy president Mat Sabu, and the party lost the seat to the United Malays National Organisation (UMNO).

In January 2010, Mohd Hayati was conferred the honorific title of Datuk by Sultan Abdul Halim of Kedah.

Election results

Honours
  :
  Knight Companion of the Order of Loyalty to the Royal House of Kedah (DSDK) – Dato' (2010)

References

Malaysian medical doctors
Living people
1957 births
People from Kedah
Malaysian Islamic Party politicians
Malaysian people of Malay descent
Malaysian Muslims
Members of the Dewan Rakyat
Members of the Kedah State Legislative Assembly
 Kedah state executive councillors